Dün was a French progressive rock band, active from 1978 to 1981, during which they played shows with Magma, Art Zoyd, Etron Fou Leloublan, and almost became a part of the short-lived Rock in Opposition grouping of bands in Europe. In 1981, they recorded an album, Eros, that apparently never secured proper distribution, and as a result is quite rare.

The French label Soleil reissued the Eros album, which included the four tracks from the original LP plus four bonus tracks, three of which are early demo versions of the tracks on the original release.

Discography
Eros (Soleil Records, 1981)

Personnel

The Band
Jean Geeraerts: Electric & Acoustic Guitars
Bruno Sabathe: Synthesizers & Piano
Pascal Vandenbulcke: Flute & Gruyérophone
Thierry Tranchant: Bass
Laurent Bertaud: Drums
Alain Termolle: Percussions, xylos, vibras...

Additional Musicians
Philippe Portejoie: Saxophone

French progressive rock groups
Zeuhl